Samut Prakan United Football Club (Thai สโมสรฟุตบอลสมุทรปราการยูไนเต็ด) is a Thailand semi professional football club based in Samut Prakan province. They currently play in 2018 Thailand Amateur League Bangkok Metropolitan Region.

History

Formed in 2009 as Thai Summit Samut Prakan, the club entered the Regional League Central-East Division and finished in 4th position, the season highlight's being the 5:0 home win over Prachuap Khiri Khan and 5:2 away win over Rose Asia Pathum Thani. Thai Summit also entered the 2009 Thai FA Cup overcoming Bangkok League opposition Bangkok North Central ASSN and Raj-Vithi before being beaten by TPL side Police United in the second round.

In 2010, the club moved into the Regional League Bangkok Area Division, coming up against teams they had beaten in the previous season's FA Cup matches. Hopes were raised on the back of these that they could mount a serious title challenge. This wasn't to be the case and the club came 7th out of 13 teams.

For the 2011 league campaign, the club was renamed Samut Prakan United. It was another season of hopes and the club progressed well on the field to come 3rd, just missing out on the playoffs.

In 2012, the club moved to their new stadium but the change of venue couldn't bring them success as they finished well off the promotion pace in mid-table.

Stadium and locations

Season By Season record

External links
 Samut Prakan United F.C. Official Website
 Samut Prakan United F.C. Official Facebookpage

Association football clubs established in 2009
Football clubs in Thailand
Sport in Samut Prakan province
2009 establishments in Thailand